Angi Uezu (January 3, 1935 - ) is the former head of one of the major Isshin-ryu karate organizations, the Okinawan Isshin-Ryu Karate Kobudo Association (O.I.K.K.A., founded in 1990). He is the son-in-law of the system's founder, Shimabuku Tatsuo, and a 10th degree black belt.

He was born in Chalan Kiya on the island of Saipan. He was injured by American machine gun fire during the Battle of Saipan. His family was repatriated to Okinawa after World War II.  In 1958, he married Yukiko Shimabuku, the third daughter of Tatsuo Shimabuku, with whom he had a son.  He began training in Isshin-ryu karate in late 1962 and received his black belt in January 1965. He is now retired from teaching martial arts and lives in Iribaru, Uruma City. Master Uezu, although retired from teaching, comes to the United States occasionally to hold seminars.

Angi was inducted into the Isshin-ryū Hall of Fame in 1997. He is the co-author (with Joseph Jennings) of the book "The Encyclopedia of Isshin-Ryu Karate: Book One, Beginner to Green Belt".

References

External links 
O.I.K.K.A home page

1935 births
Living people
Japanese male karateka